The 2009 NCAA Division I softball season, play of college softball in the United States organized by the National Collegiate Athletic Association (NCAA) at the Division I level, began in February 2009.  The season progressed through the regular season, many conference tournaments and championship series, and concluded with the 2009 NCAA Division I softball tournament and 2009 Women's College World Series.  The Women's College World Series, consisting of the eight remaining teams in the NCAA Tournament and held in held in Oklahoma City at ASA Hall of Fame Stadium, ended on June 2, 2009.

Conference standings

Women's College World Series
The 2009 NCAA Women's College World Series took place from May 28 to June 2, 2009 in Oklahoma City.

Season leaders
Batting
Batting average: .500 – Re'Quincia Mack, Alabama A&M Lady Bulldogs
RBIs: 96 – Stacie Chambers, Arizona Wildcats
Home runs: 31 – Stacie Chambers, Arizona Wildcats

Pitching
Wins: 42-8 – Danielle Lawrie Washington Huskies
ERA: 0.61 (25 ER/285.1 IP) – Stacey Nelson, Florida Gators
Strikeouts: 521 – Danielle Lawrie Washington Huskies

Records
Team single game double plays:
5 – Alabama Crimson Tide; May 17, 2009

Awards
USA Softball Collegiate Player of the Year:
Danielle Lawrie Washington Huskies

Honda Sports Award Softball:
Danielle Lawrie Washington Huskies

All America Teams
The following players were members of the All-American Teams.

First Team

Second Team

Third Team

References

External links